Dylan, Cash, and the Nashville Cats: A New Music City is a multi-artist compilation album released in June 2015 by Legacy Recordings and the Country Music Hall of Fame and Museum's CMF label. It accompanied the Country Music Hall of Fame's exhibition of the same name, which opened in Nashville in March 2015 and documented the overlapping influence between country music and rock music during the 1960s and 1970s.

The two-disc album includes a previously unreleased version of Bob Dylan's 1970 song "If Not for You" with Lloyd Green on pedal steel guitar. The booklet accompanying the physical release contains notes on the 36 tracks and an introduction by Tracy Nelson.

Track listing

References 

2015 compilation albums
Country Music Hall of Fame and Museum